Best of Budgie was the first compilation album by Welsh rock band Budgie. It contained tracks from the band's third, fourth and fifth studio albums. At over an hour in length, it is among the longest single-LP rock records.

Track listing

Personnel
Budgie
Burke Shelley - bass, vocals
Tony Bourge - guitar
Ray Phillips - drums (tracks 1, 4, 7 & 9)
Pete Boot - drums (tracks 5 & 8)
Steve Williams - drums (tracks 2, 3 & 6)

Budgie (band) compilation albums
1975 greatest hits albums